City Vibrance: Recent Works in Western Media by Hong Kong Artists was an art exhibition held at the Hong Kong Museum of Art from 27 March to 2 May 1992. It showcased the work of a broad cross-section of contemporary Hong Kong artists using a wide range of art media.

History
City Vibrance was the second special exhibition held at the then-new Hong Kong Museum of Art. It was presented by the Urban Council, which also published an exhibition book, and was organised by the curatorial staff of the art museum.

Theme and content
The exhibition was curated by Gerard C.C. Tsang of the Hong Kong Museum of Art. According to Tsang, the exhibition was "an exploration of artistic sensitivity and response to the living environment in a cosmopolitan city like Hong Kong". The artists were asked to contribute works that expressed their feelings about living in Hong Kong at that time.

The featured works made use of a wide variety of so-called Western art media. The exhibition showcased paintings, sculpture, illustrations, photography, and pieces involving video stills and more experimental materials.

Reception
The first special exhibition held at the new Museum of Art, which opened in 1991, was a showcase of French artwork entitled Too French. The event was criticised for being narrow in scope for an opening exhibition at an ostensibly international art gallery, and for being "too far removed from Hong Kong culture". On the other hand, City Vibrance was praised for bringing attention to the work of local artists.

Some art observers were critical of the exhibition's use of the term "Western media". The 1997 handover of Hong Kong was approaching, and it was felt that Hong Kong artists would be disadvantaged in the future if their work was presented as being derivative of Western styles and methods. Critics also accused the Museum of Art of generally taking a narrow-minded view of what constitutes "Hong Kong art", associating the term with the use of traditional Chinese methods such as ink and brush, and treating artists working in other media as being culturally transgressive.

A review in the South China Morning Post called the "City Vibrance" theme "vapid", and observed that the artists all seem to have ignored it and "did their own thing" instead.

Exhibited artists
The exhibition included works by 49 Hong Kong-based artists.

References

1992 in art
1992 in Hong Kong
Contemporary art exhibitions